CONICYT is a Chilean government agency responsible for coordinating, promoting and aiding scientific research in the country. The name is an acronym of Comisión Nacional de Investigación Científica y Tecnológica meaning "National Commission for Scientific and Technological Research". CONICYT is part of the Ministry of Education.

CONICYT provides grants through several programs:
 FONDECYT (National Fund for Scientific and Technological Development)
 FONDEF (Fund for the Promotion of Scientific and Technological Development)
 FONDAP (Financing Fund Research Centres in Priority Areas)
 National Fund for Research and Development in Health
 Regional Fund for Scientific and Technological Development
 Explore program

References

Science and technology in Chile
Ministry of Education (Chile)
Research councils
Research funding agencies
Research and development organizations